Jolarpet is a state assembly constituency in Tamil Nadu, India, formed after constituency delimitations in 2007. Its State Assembly Constituency number is 49. It comprises portions of Natrampalli taluk, Vaniyambadi and Tirupattur taluks and is a part of the Tiruvannamalai parliamentary constituency for national elections. It is one of the 234 State Legislative Assembly Constituencies in Tamil Nadu in India.

Members of the Legislative Assembly

Election results

2021

2016

2011

References 

Assembly constituencies of Tamil Nadu
Jolarpet